This article lists the results for the China PR national football team between 2010 and 2019.

2010

2011

2012

2013

2014

2015

2016

2017

2018

2019

See also
China PR national football team results

References

External links
China national football team fixtures and results FIFA.com
Team China official website

2010-19
2010s in Chinese football